The Grammy Award for Best Jazz Instrumental Album is an award that was first presented in 1959.

History
From 1959 to 2011, the Award was called Best Instrumental Jazz Album, Individual or Group. In 2012, it was shortened to Best Jazz Instrumental Album, encompassing albums that previously fell under the categories Best Contemporary Jazz Album and Best Latin Jazz Album (both defunct as of 2012). A year later, the Best Latin Jazz Album category returned, disallowing albums in that category to be nominated for Best Jazz Instrumental Album.

This category is meant for albums containing greater than 50% playing time of new instrumental jazz recordings.

Years listed indicate the year in which the Grammy Awards were presented, for works released in the previous year. Before 1962 and from 1972 to 1978, the award title did not specify instrumental performances and was presented for instrumental or vocal performances. The award has had several name changes.

Name changes
 1959–1960: Best Jazz Performance, Group
 1961: Best Jazz Performance Solo or Small Group
 1962–1963: Best Jazz Performance Solo or Small Group (Instrumental)
 1964: Best Instrumental Jazz Performance – Soloist or Small Group
 1965–1966: Best Instrumental Jazz Performance – Small Group or Soloist
 1967: Best Instrumental Jazz Performance – Group or Soloist with Group
 1968–1971: Best Instrumental Jazz Performance, Small Group or Soloist with Small Group
 1972–1978: Best Jazz Performance by a Group
 1979–1992: Best Jazz Instrumental Performance, Group
 1993–2000: Best Jazz Instrumental Performance, Individual or Group
 2001–2011: Best Jazz Instrumental Album, Individual or Group

Recipients

See also
 Grammy Award for Best Large Jazz Ensemble Album
 Grammy Award for Best Improvised Jazz Solo
 Grammy Award for Best Jazz Vocal Album

References

 
Grammy Awards for jazz
Jazz Instrumental Album
Album awards